Ben Greenwood (born 30 July 1984 in Nether Kellet, Lancashire) is a British road racing cyclist who is now a coach with the Great Britain Cycling Team. Originally from Lancashire he now lives in Cheshire and has also represented Scotland. A former member of the Great Britain Under-23 Academy, he has also been a member of the  team, and won the Under-23 British Road Championship and the hill climb championship in 2005. He also competed in the Under-23 road race at the 2006 UCI Road World Championships in Salzburg, Austria.

References

External links

English male cyclists
1984 births
Living people
Sportspeople from Lancaster, Lancashire